The Cobourg Police Service (CPS) is a municipal police force in Cobourg, Ontario, Canada. As of 2021, the service employed 35 police officers, 28 special constables, and 11 auxiliary constables. The force is notable for its tiered police service delivery model, which it adopted in 2018, and the V13 Policetech Accelerator, which it operates alongside the Northumberland Community Futures Development Corporation. The Accelerator facilitates research and development partnerships between small or starting businesses and the CPS.

The service is the largest provider of third-party criminal records checks in Canada. Revenue generated from the checks funds the force's Corporate Services division, which performs the records checks; capital investments in the police service; and local social services.

History

The Town of Cobourg was incorporated out of Hamilton Township in 1837, and a single-officer police force operating out of Victoria Hall had been established by 1898.

In 1915, Constable William Rourke suffered a fatal heart attack during a violent arrest. He had been employed by the force for 22 years.

In 1970, the Canadian Armed Forces determined that the Cobourg Armoury building — a two-storey brick structure that had been built in 1904 a few blocks west of Victoria Hall — was surplus, and turned the structure over to the Town of Cobourg. The building was subsequently turned over to the police force in 1971.

In the early 2000s, various politicians, the Cobourg and Port Hope Police Associations, and the Cobourg Police Services Board advocated for or endorsed studies of the amalgamation of the Cobourg Police Service and neighbouring Port Hope Police Service. In 2003, the Cobourg Police Services Board hired Garry Clement, a former RCMP officer, as the Cobourg Police Service's new chief of police, with a mandate to amalgamate the two police forces into one service covering all of West Northumberland, including the Town of Cobourg, Municipality of Port Hope, and Township of Hamilton. Port Hope ultimately elected to maintain its independent police service, and as of 2022, both municipalities continue to maintain individual police forces.

In 2004, 18-year old Troy Davey called Cobourg Police claiming to have been the victim of a robbery. While being interviewed by Constable Chris Garrett, Davey pulled out a knife and fatally wounded the lone officer, who managed to shoot Davey in the leg before collapsing. Davey was arrested at the Northumberland Hills Hospital shortly thereafter, where he had sought medical attention for his gunshot wound. It was later determined that Davey had made a hoax call with the intent of ambushing responding police officers with a knife and bomb, and he was found guilty of first-degree murder in 2007.

In 2018, the Service, Northumberland County OPP, and Northumberland Hills Hospital (NHH) established a shared mental health crisis response team which partnered specially-trained OPP and CPS officers with NHH nurses, operating 5 days a week.

During the summer of 2022, the Cobourg Police Service provided parking enforcement under contract to neighbouring Hamilton Township. The service was provided by the force's special constables.

Rank structure

Sworn officers

Investigative staff
The Cobourg Police Service divides its investigative staff into two categories, sworn and non-sworn. Sworn investigators hold the ranks of Detective Constable or Detective Sergeant, but these ranks are equivalent to Sergeant or Staff Sergeant, respectively. Non-sworn investigators are special constables employed for crime-scene processing and forensic identification services, and are referred to either as scene-of-crime officers (SOCO) or forensic identification specialists.

Special constables
Cobourg Police special constables are divided into two ranks, special constable and special constable supervisor, and wear baby blue dress shirts, navy blue trousers with no trouser piping, and peaked caps with red bands or ballcaps. Rank slides are identical to those of sworn constables, but are marked with "Special Constable" or "Special Constable Supervisor" lettering above the Canadian flag.

Auxiliary constables

Auxiliary constables are supervised by sworn police managers, and do not have an internal rank structure. Auxiliary constables wear baby blue dress shirts, navy blue trousers with no trouser piping, and peaked caps with checkered red bands or ballcaps. Rank slides are identical to those of sworn constables, but are marked with "Auxiliary" lettering above the Canadian flag.

Sidearms and weapons
 Glock 22: Large frame .40 S&W
 Sig Sauer P226
 Pepper spray (OC spray): Regular uniformed officers
 Diemaco C8 carbine

Chief & Tenure

Units
Criminal Investigation Bureau (CIB)

Forensic Identification Services (FIS)

Human Trafficking Unit

Drugs and Intelligence

Major Cases

Bail/Court Compliance

Mental Health Response

Court Services

References

Cobourg
Law enforcement agencies of Ontario